María Rosario Navarro Santos-Concio (born October 27, 1955), popularly known as Charo Santos-Concio or simply Charo Santos, is a Filipino media executive and actress. She is the host of Maalaala Mo Kaya, the longest-running television drama anthology in Asia. From 2012 to 2016, she was the chief executive officer of ABS-CBN Corporation, the largest entertainment and media conglomerate in the Philippines. Currently she serves as chief content officer and president of ABS-CBN University. Santos-Concio plays a powerful role in TV and film production in the Philippines.

On March 3, 2008, she was promoted as the fifth president of ABS-CBN Corporation and in charge of the company's total business portfolio, taking over from interim president Eugenio López III. She took over as CEO after López retired on December 31, 2015.

Career
Santos-Concio was first noticed by the media as Baron Travel Girl in 1976. She also worked as a production assistant with the pre-martial law ABS-CBN.

In the 1980s, Santos-Concio produced a number of films such as Oro, Plata, Mata and Himala under the Experimental Cinema of the Philippines. She also served as the creative force behind the productions of Vanguard Films and Vision Films before moving to Regal Films.

She established herself as an award-winning dramatic actress early in her career, winning the trophy for her performance in Mike de Leon’s Itim during the 1977 Asian Film Festival. She was critically acclaimed for her performance in Lino Brocka’s 1990 film Gumapang Ka Sa Lusak which won several awards including a Best Director FAMAS for Brocka. Santos has also won four FAMAS Award nominations. She obtained two Best Actress nominations for Pag-Ibig na Walang Dangal (1980) and Kontrobersiyal (1981) and Best Supporting Actress nominations for Gumapang Ka Sa Lusak (1990) and Ms. Dolora X (1993). She also earned three Gawad Urian nominations for The Woman Who Left, Gumapang Ka Sa Lusak, and Itim.

In 1987, while working for Regal Films, she was invited to join the new ABS-CBN, which had reopened on September 14, 1986. Santos-Concio was promoted from Production Manager, to Program Director to Executive Vice-President.  She is credited in the production of several phenomenal television series of ABS-CBN including Esperanza, Mula Sa Puso, Pangako Sa 'Yo, and Kay Tagal Kang Hinintay.  Her film background played an important role in the creation of Star Cinema. She is also behind the longest-running Philippine TV drama anthology program Maalaala Mo Kaya, which she has hosted since it premiered in 1991.

On December 26, 2007, the Film Academy of the Philippines (FAP) awarded Santos-Concio with the Manuel de Leon Award for her work in the industry.
On March 1, 2008, she was appointed as the 5th President of ABS-CBN, making her the first woman president of the media conglomerate and the Lopez Group of Companies.

On January 1, 2016, Ma'am Charo stepped down as President and CEO of ABS-CBN Corporation and was succeeded by Carlo Katigbak, the Chief Operating Officer of the company at that time. She's currently the Chief Content Officer of ABS-CBN Corporation and the President of ABS-CBN University.

Awards and recognitions

2015 Fleur-de-lis Award, St. Paul University Manila
2014 Female Makabata Star, Anak TV Awards
2014 Gold Stevie Award in the Female Executive of the Year in Asia, Australia, or New Zealand category, Stevie Awards for Women in Business
2014 Asian Media Woman of the Year, ContentAsia
2014 Woman Achiever for Tourism and International Understanding, 24th SKAL Tourism Personality Awards
2014 Woman of the Year for the Philippines, 1st Asia-Pacific Stevie Awards
2014 FitzGerald Belfry Lifetime Achievement of The Year, 94th Las Familias Unidas FitzGerald Awards
2013 OFW Gawad Parangal, Kapisanan ng mga Kamag-anak ng Migranteng Manggagawang Pilipino, Inc. (KAKAMMPI)
2013 Anak TV Seal Award, Anak TV Awards
2013 Golden Wheel Award for Corporate Media Management, Rotary International District 3780 and the Quezon City government's The Rotary Golden Wheel Awards
2013 Kapisanan ng mga Brodkaster ng Pilipinas (KBP) Lifetime Achievement Award, 21st Golden Dove Awards
2013 25-year Service Award, ABS-CBN Corporation’s Kapamilya Awards, 2013 Tourism Award (For Media Broadcast), Rotary Club of Manila’s 9th Tourism Awards
2012 Gawad Tanglaw Sa Sining ng Telebisyon, 10th Gawad Tanglaw Awards
2012 Outstanding Paulinian, St. Paul University Manila
2011 Female Makabata Star, Anak TV Awards 
2011 Woman Super Achiever Award, CMO Asia’s Woman Super Achiever Awards
2011 Lifetime Achievement Award, Golden Screen TV Awards
2011 Gawad Parangal, Quezon City Government’s Gawad Parangal
2010 CEO Communication Excellence in Organizations Award, International Association of Business Communicators (IABC) CEO Excel Awards
2010 Anak TV Seal Award, Anak TV Awards
2007 Manuel de Leon Award, Film Academy of the Philippines (FAP) Awards
2007 Ading Fernando Lifetime Achievement Award, 21st Philippine Movie Press Club (PMPC) Star Awards for Television
1978 Best Actress for the film “Itim,” Asian Film Festival

Filmography

Television

Movies

Notes
Santos-Concio's full name is unclear as her birth was registered prior to July 1956 birth registration where the middle name or maternal family name was implemented.

References

External links

Raymond Ang (October 1, 2016) COVER: Charo, reborn. Philstar Global

1955 births
Living people
Filipino film producers
Filipino people of Spanish descent
Filipino film actresses
Filipino television personalities
Actors from Manila
ABS-CBN executives
ABS-CBN personalities
St. Paul University alumni
Women chief executives
Filipino chief executives
People from Oriental Mindoro
Filipino television actresses